William George Leonard Graham (17 October 1925 – 30 September 2007) was a Northern Ireland international footballer and football manager. A full-back, he made 303 league appearances in a nine-year career in the Football League with Doncaster Rovers lasting most of the 1950s. He also played for Linfield Swifts, Brantwood, and Torquay United, and briefly managed Ards. He won 14 caps for Northern Ireland in the 1950s.

Club career
Graham began his career playing as an inside-forward with Linfield Swifts, but began playing as a full-back after joining Brantwood. In October 1949, he became one of Peter Doherty's first signings as Doncaster Rovers manager, although had to wait until 18 March 1950 for his debut, a 2–0 home win against Wrexham. "Donny" went on to win promotion out of the Third Division North as champions in 1949–50. The Belle Vue outfit then successfully survived as a mid-table Second Division side in 1950–51, 1951–52, 1952–53, 1953–54, 1954–55, 1955–56, and 1956–57, before being relegated into the Third Division at the end of the 1957–58 campaign. In November 1958, Graham signed with Torquay United. He played 20 Fourth Division games to help Eric Webber's "Gulls" to a 12th-place finish in 1958–59. He then left Plainmoor and returned to Northern Ireland as player-manager of Irish League side Ards, but left Ards at the end of the 1959–60 season.

International career
On 7 March 1951, Graham made his debut for Peter Doherty's Northern Ireland in a 2–1 defeat at home to Wales and was a regular in the Northern Irish side until the end of 1955 when Willie Cunningham replaced him. Graham was a member of the 22-man 1958 Northern Ireland World Cup squad, but was one of five unlucky squad members who didn't travel to Sweden for the tournament (of 16 nations taking part, Northern Ireland was one of only three which did not take the full permitted complement of 22 players). He did however make one further appearance for Northern Ireland, on 4 October 1958, in a 3–3 draw at home to England, their first game after the World Cup Finals. Graham remains the most capped international player in Doncaster Rovers' history.

Coaching career
Graham later worked as first-team coach at Stoke City, and became new manager Tony Waddington's assistant in 1960. From 1965 he coached at Port Vale under manager Stanley Matthews, before taking up the same position at Blackpool in 1967, under manager Stan Mortensen, before his retirement from football in 1975, after which he worked at British Aerospace.

Career statistics

Club playing statistics
Source:

International playing statistics

Honours
Doncaster Rovers
Football League Third Division North: 1949–50

References

1925 births
2007 deaths
Association footballers from Belfast
Association footballers from Northern Ireland
Northern Ireland international footballers
Association football fullbacks
Doncaster Rovers F.C. players
Torquay United F.C. players
Ards F.C. players
Brantwood F.C. players
English Football League players
1958 FIFA World Cup players
Association football coaches
Stoke City F.C. non-playing staff
Port Vale F.C. non-playing staff
Blackpool F.C. non-playing staff
Football managers from Northern Ireland
Association football player-managers
Ards F.C. managers